There are over 200 ports in the Baltic Sea (or 190, when only those ports that handle a minimum of 50,000 tonnes of cargo annually and where at least part of this cargo is international are taken into account). In 2008, the total amount of cargo handled in the Baltic Sea ports amounted to 822.4 million tonnes, which was 0.4 per cent less than in 2007. Primorsk, Saint Petersburg and Ust-Luga were the biggest ports in the Baltic Sea in 2008. Together the three top ports handled over one fifth of total cargo volumes in the Baltic Sea in 2008.

This table lists statistics (2002) (Świnoujście, Szczecin and Helsinki - 2004, Lübeck and Rostock - 2005, Gdynia, Klaipėda, Gdańsk, Riga, Liepāja - 2010) for the major ports of the Baltic Sea. Container traffic is given in terms of Twenty-foot equivalent units of cargo.

References

Baltic Sea
Baltic Sea
 
Baltic Sea